Independent Order of Odd Fellows Building is a historic building in San Diego, California.  Built in 1882, the Odd Fellows Building was added to the National Register of Historic Places in 1978.

References

External links

Clubhouses on the National Register of Historic Places in California
Cultural infrastructure completed in 1882
National Register of Historic Places in San Diego
Odd Fellows buildings in California